Beloyarsky (masculine), Beloyarskaya (feminine), or Beloyarskoye (neuter) may refer to:
Beloyarsky District, several districts in Russia
Beloyarsky Urban Settlement, a municipal formation in Beloyarsky Municipal District which the town of okrug significance of Beloyarsky in Khanty-Mansi Autonomous Okrug, Russia is incorporated as
Beloyarskoye Urban Settlement, a municipal formation which the work settlement of Bely Yar and the village of Poludenovka in Verkhneketsky District of Tomsk Oblast, Russia are incorporated as
Beloyarsky (inhabited locality) (Beloyarskaya, Beloyarskoye), several inhabited localities in Russia